"Dear Mama" is a song by American rapper 2Pac from his third studio album, Me Against the World (1995). It was released on February 21, 1995, as the lead single from the album. The song is a tribute to his mother, Afeni Shakur. In the song, Shakur details his childhood poverty and his mother's addiction to crack cocaine, but argues that his love and deep respect for his mother supersede bad memories. The song became his first top ten on the Billboard Hot 100, peaking at number nine. It also topped the Hot Rap Singles chart for five weeks. As of March 2021, the song is certified 3× Platinum by the RIAA.

"Dear Mama" has been consistently ranked among the best of its genre, appearing on numerous "greatest" lists. In 2009, the song was inducted into the National Recording Registry by the Library of Congress, who deemed it a work that is "culturally, historically, or aesthetically important, and/or inform or reflect life in the United States", making it the first hip hop recording by a soloist to be inducted. In a press release, the organization called the song "a moving and eloquent homage to both the murdered rapper's own mother and all mothers struggling to maintain a family in the face of addiction, poverty and societal indifference."

Background
The song is a tribute to Shakur's mother, Afeni Shakur. She and her husband were active members of the Black Panther Party in New York in the late 1960s and early 1970s. Shakur was born a month after his mother was acquitted of more than 150 charges of "Conspiracy against the United States government and New York landmarks" in the New York "Panther 21" court case. She was often absent during his childhood in favor of being an activist, and also during his adolescence when she became addicted to crack cocaine. Shakur was kicked out by Afeni at age 17, and they had little contact for many years. Having "lost all respect" for his mother, he subsequently moved into a vacant apartment with friends and began writing poetry and rap lyrics. In 1990, realizing her habit was out-of-control, she enrolled in a 12-step program at a drug and alcohol treatment center in Norwalk, Connecticut. After completion, she reconciled with her son, who was at this point a successful recording artist.

Record producer Tony Pizarro explained;

The song was written shortly before Shakur served a prison term. Upon completion of the track, Shakur phoned longtime friend Jada Pinkett-Smith, remarking;  Pinkett-Smith's mother too had struggled with drug addiction, and their experiences growing up with this as children led to their friendship. She later remarked that the song gave her a "rush of emotions" upon her first listen. Johnny J, one of the rapper's producers, noted that "The emotional, the sad songs, were his personal favorites." 

Shakur mentioned the song and his intentions behind it in a 1995 interview with the Los Angeles Times:  When questioned on possible misogyny in his lyrics, Shakur defended his music, noting that he worked in the studio with women and played his songs for women pre-release, remarking;

Lyrical content and message

In "Dear Mama," Shakur praises his mother's courage, arguing that many mothers share this trait, and also describes the "highs and lows" of her past. In a cultural and historical context, "Dear Mama" is part of a long line of hip-hop songs in which male rappers state their reverence for their mothers. Statistics show that a disproportionate number of African-American households are headed by single mothers, and Hess asserts that their bravery and role in their children's lives leads to their status as an "eternal symbol of love" in their offspring's eyes. Mickey Hess, author of Is Hip Hop Dead?: The Past, Present, and Future of America's Most Wanted Music, asserts that his mother's appearance in Shakur's music works is designed to establish credibility with listeners. In this sense, he "connects himself to black radical history through his mother's affiliation with the Black Panthers," and explains that his music is autobiographical, illustrating that 2Pac (the stage performer) and Tupac Shakur (the person) are one and the same. In addition, Shakur recorded the tune as he knew he was not the only person to grow up with a parent struggling with drug addiction.

The song's most famous lyric is one in which Shakur "declares his love for Afeni as well as his disappointment in her": 

Michael Eric Dyson, author of Holler If You Hear Me: Searching for Tupac Shakur, writes that this line speaks to Shakur's maturity:  In the song, Shakur also takes aim at the lack of a father figure in his life: "No love from my daddy cause the coward wasn't there / He passed away and I didn't cry, cause my anger wouldn't let me feel for a stranger." The line, according to Black Fathers: An Invisible Presence in America, "seemed to resonate with a generation of Black males who felt estranged from their fathers." Shakur also describes "being kicked out of his home at 17, selling crack rock with thugs who offered paternalistic support, hugging his mother from behind bars." "Dear Mama" samples the songs "Sadie" (1974) by The Spinners, and "In All My Wildest Dreams" (1978) by Joe Sample but in the chorus "Sadie" is replaced with "lady".

According to The Philadelphia Tribune George Yancy, the slowness of the beat creates in the listener a mood of reflective reminiscence. Tupac begins by creating a context where his mother was simply taken for granted against the backdrop of his rather mischievous behavior. He says, "Suspended from school, scared to go home, I was a fool with the big boys breaking all the rules." He then reflects on how he no doubt blamed the wrong person: "I shed tears with my baby sister. Over the years we were poorer than the other little kids. And even though we had different daddies, the same drama, when things went wrong, we blamed mama. I reminisce on the stress I caused..."

Release and reception

"Dear Mama" entered Billboards Hot R&B Singles chart on March 11, 1995, rose to number 2 the next week, then to number 1 during the week of March 25. The song topped the Billboard Hot Rap Singles chart for five weeks and peaked at number nine on the Hot 100. It also topped the Hot Dance Music Maxi-Singles sales chart for four weeks. The single was certified platinum by the RIAA on July 13, 1995, and sold 700,000 copies domestically.

The Los Angeles Times praised the tune, writing, "The song attests to Shakur's gift at crystallizing complex emotions in simple stark images." Rolling Stone called the song "a heartfelt, sometimes harsh dedication of love for his mother that deals with the trials and tribulations each has put the other through." In his dean's list for the Pazz & Jop critics poll, Robert Christgau named "Dear Mama" the eighth best single of 1995.

Music video
The video features an appearance by Afeni Shakur, who re-enacts her reconciliation with a lookalike of her son. Tupac himself was serving his four-and-a-half-year prison sentence. He released this song, and the associated album, while being sentenced. While in prison his album quickly climbed the charts. The demand for a video grew: the video was released while he was in prison and for that reason could not be in the video. No other video was made when he was released.

Legacy
The song is often considered Shakur's most "emotionally resonant" song. Rolling Stone placed "Dear Mama" at number 18 on its 2012 list of The 50 Greatest Hip-Hop Songs of All Time, writing, "The song is the ne plus ultra of hip-hop odes to Mom." The song was also ranked number four on About.com's "Top 100 Rap Songs" list. Carrie Golus of USA Today opined that "Dear Mama" was the sole reason for the double-platinum certifications of Me Against the World. Golus also argues that the song revealed a softer side of the rapper, leading to increased recognition, especially among female fans. Following the rapper's death, his mother mentioned the song in a People article:  LA Weekly placed the song 6 on their list The 20 Best Hip-Hop Songs in History.

"Dear Mama" was one of 25 recordings selected for preservation at the National Recording Registry in the Library of Congress in 2010, making it the third hip hop song to do so, following tracks by Public Enemy and Grandmaster Flash. The Library of Congress has called the song "a moving and eloquent homage to both the murdered rapper's own mother and all mothers struggling to maintain a family in the face of addiction, poverty and societal indifference." On the subject of the inclusion, Afeni Shakur stated,

Influence
The song has had an impact on numerous rappers. Eminem stated that the song played constantly in his car in the year following its release. 
Common remarked;  Kendrick Lamar noted that the song profoundly impacted his life, writing,

Track listing
12", cassette, CD, maxi
"Dear Mama" (LP Version) — 4:41
"Dear Mama" (Instrumental) — 5:21
"Bury Me a G" — 4:59
"Dear Mama" (Moe Z. Mix) — 5:09
"Dear Mama" (Instrumental Moe Z. Mix) — 5:09
"Old School" (LP Version) — 4:59

Credits and personnel
Background vocals:  "Sweet Franklin", Reggie (Reginald) Green
Co-Producers: DF Master Tee, Moses
Engineer: Tony Pizarro
Mix engineers: Paul Arnold, Leevester Clay
Producer: Tony Pizarro
Rap Vocals: 2Pac
 Keys: Reggie Green
 Bass: Charles Jefferson
 Guitar: Reggie Mc Glover

Charts

Weekly charts

Year-end charts

Certifications

References

External links

1995 singles
1990s ballads
Tupac Shakur songs
United States National Recording Registry recordings
Songs with feminist themes
Songs about mothers
Songs about childhood
Songs about nostalgia
Interscope Records singles
Jive Records singles
Songs written by Tupac Shakur